Touch of Death is a 1961 black and white British crime genre film directed by Lance Comfort and starring William Lucas.

Premise
A criminal gang pull off a big robbery, unaware the cash has been infected with toxic poison. The thieves hide out on a Thames houseboat and terrorise its female occupant (Jan Waters), before they start dying.

Cast
 William Lucas as Pete Mellor
 David Sumner as Len Williams
 Ray Barrett as Maxwell
 Jan Waters as Jackie
 Frank Coda as Sgt. Byrne
 Roberta Tovey as Pam
 Geoffrey Denton as Baxter
 Lane Meddick as Morgan
 Ann Martin as Mrs. Morgan
 Christopher Brett as Mike
 Clifford Earl as Mr. Grey
 Alethea Charlton as Mrs. Grey

Critical reception
AllMovie wrote, "Director Lance Comfort wasn't what you could call inspired, but he sure knew how to sustain audience interest."

References

External links
List of films directed by Lance Comfort
 

1961 films
1961 crime films
British crime films
British black-and-white films
Films directed by Lance Comfort
1960s English-language films
1960s British films